"Boots or Hearts" is a song by Canadian rock band The Tragically Hip. It was released in January 1990 as the third single from their second studio album, Up to Here. The song reached number 41 in Canada.

Track listing

Charts

References

1990 singles
The Tragically Hip songs
1990 songs
MCA Records singles
Songs written by Rob Baker (guitarist)
Songs written by Gord Downie